McKendree Mitchell House is a historic home located at Batesburg-Leesville, Lexington County, South Carolina. It was built in 1873, and is a -story, Greek Revival style cottage on a brick foundation.  It is sheathed in weatherboard and features a projecting central gabled portico.

It was listed on the National Register of Historic Places in 1982.

References

Houses on the National Register of Historic Places in South Carolina
Greek Revival houses in South Carolina
Houses completed in 1873
Houses in Lexington County, South Carolina
National Register of Historic Places in Lexington County, South Carolina